Triteleia grandiflora is a species of flowering plant known by the common names largeflower triteleia, largeflower tripletlily, and wild hyacinth.

Description

Triteleia grandiflora is a perennial herb growing from a corm. Each flower is a funnel-shaped bloom borne on a pedicel up to 4 or 5 cm long. The flower may be up to 3.5 cm long including the tubular throat and six tepals each just over 1 cm long. The inner set of three tepals are somewhat ruffled and broader than the outer tepals. The flower corolla may be deep blue to almost white with a darker blue mid-vein. There are six stamens with purple or yellow anthers. The prominent tubular flower throat distinguishes T. grandiflora from Triteleia hyacinthina, whose range overlaps T. grandiflora.

Distribution and habitat
Triteleia grandiflora is native to western North America from British Columbia to extreme northern California, eastward into Idaho, Montana and northern Utah, with disjunct populations occurring in Wyoming and Colorado. Its habitat includes grassland, sagebrush, woodlands, and forests.

Uses
The corm provides food for various wild rodents and livestock, and Native Americans and settlers found them edible as well.

See also
 List of plants known as lily

References

External links

Jepson Manual Treatment: var. howellii
Flora of North America
Washington Burke Museum
Southwest Colorado Wildflowers
Photo gallery

grandiflora
Flora of the Northwestern United States
Flora of British Columbia
Flora of California
Flora of the Klamath Mountains
Plants described in 1830
Edible plants
Flora without expected TNC conservation status